Local elections were held in Cape Verde on 18 May 2008.

The MpD won in the municipalities of Boa Vista, Maio, Porto Novo, Praia, Ribeira Grande, Ribeira Grande de Santiago, Santa Catarina, São Domingos, São Miguel, São Vicente and Tarrafal while PAICV won in the municipalities of Brava, Mosteiros, Paul, Ribeira Brava, Santa Catarina do Fogo, Santa Cruz, São Filipe, São Lourenço dos Órgãos, São Salvador do Mundo and Tarrafal de São Nicolau.

Results

Municipal (câmara) results
The final results were:

Municipal assembly results
The final results were:

References

2008 in Cape Verde
2008
2008 elections in Africa